Happy Valley, Pennsylvania is a region of Centre County that contains the borough of State College, and the townships of College, Harris, Patton, and Ferguson. Collectively, these municipalities comprise the Centre Region Council of Governments. By definition, the region is bounded by Nittany Valley to the northeast, Penns Valley to the east, and Bald Eagle Valley to the north and west. Centre County is the State College, Pennsylvania metropolitan statistical area, which is part of the State College–DuBois, PA Combined Statistical Area.

History
The name Happy Valley was given to the area in the Great Depression-era of the 1930s since it was generally not hit hard financially by the depression because of the presence of Pennsylvania State University.  The term "Happy Valley" is generally synonymous with Centre County, Pennsylvania including State College Borough, townships of College, Harris, Patton, and Ferguson, etc. in the Centre Region. Bellefonte, Philipsburg, Milesburg, and Centre Hall, Pennsylvania are all a part of Happy Valley.

Culture

The culture of Happy Valley is largely dominated by Penn State University. The activities that occur in this region largely surround the student activities, such as student arrivals, football Saturdays, Homecoming, and graduation.  Though the region is also home to the State College Spikes, a minor league baseball team, the area is most known for the Penn State Nittany Lions football team.

During the summer session, the student population returns to their home towns, thus reducing the local population significantly.  During this time, the Central Pennsylvania Festival of the Arts, usually referred to as "Arts Fest", is held for five days and draws many visitors to town during what would otherwise be a quiet period.  Streets are closed off and lined with booths where people can buy paintings, pottery, jewelry, and other hand-made goods. There are also numerous musical performances and plays to take in, and food vendors selling everything from funnel cakes to Indian cuisine.

The Penn State IFC/Panhellenic Dance Marathon, commonly referred to as THON, is a 46-hour Dance Marathon that takes place every February on the University Park campus with the purpose of raising money for the Four Diamonds Foundation. A number of events throughout the year pave the way to February's THON weekend. The Borough of State College changes its name during the 46-hour event to City of THON even though the event takes place in College Township and not State College.

Blue-White Football Weekend occurs in April and includes a carnival, fireworks, food vendors, the student entertainment stage, live music, a parade, and more. On game day, an autograph session with the football student-athletes is held in Beaver Stadium, prior to kickoff of the Blue-White football intrasquad scrimmage game.

Demographics

Crime
In a 2014 comparison of 380 metropolitan statistical areas in the United States, Happy Valley had the lowest vehicle theft rate.

References

State College, Pennsylvania